Aleksandr Borisovich Lebziak (born 15 April 1969) is a Russian boxer, who won the Gold medal in the men's Light Heavyweight (81 kg) category at the 2000 Summer Olympics in Sydney. He beat Rudolf Kraj in the final.

Lebziak also won the World Amateur Boxing Championships in 1997. At the 1991 World Amateur Championships he won a silver medal in the Middleweight (75 kg) category. He also triumphed at the 2000 European Amateur Boxing Championships in Tampere, Finland.

Highlights
1987 Junior World Champion at Light Middleweight (Havana, Cuba)
1990 Middleweight Bronze Medalist at Goodwill Games in Seattle, United States. Results were:
Defeated Ray Downey (Canada) points
Lost to Torsten Schmitz (Germany) points
1991 Lost to Sven Ottke (Germany) as a Middleweight at European Championships in Gothenburg, Sweden
1991 2nd place at Middleweight at World Championships in Sydney, Australia. Results were:
Defeated Robert Buda (Poland) TKO 2
Defeated Sven Ottke (Germany) points
Defeated Ramon Garbey (Cuba) points
Lost to Tommaso Russo (Italy) points
Represented the Unified Team at the 1992 Barcelona Olympics as a Middleweight. Results were:
Defeated Justann Crawford (Australia) RSC 3 (1:56)
Lost to Chris Byrd (United States) 7-16
1993 Lost to Sven Ottke (Germany) as a Middleweight at World Championships in Tampere, Finland.
1993 2nd place at Middleweight in European Championships in Bursa, Turkey. Results were:
Defeated Mkhitar Vanesian (Armenia) points
Defeated Akin Kuloglu (Turkey) points
Lost to Dirk Eigenbrodt (Germany) points
1994 Bronze Medalist at Middleweight at Goodwill Games in St. Petersburg, Russia. Results were:
Defeated Vitaly Kopitko (Ukraine) points
Lost to Ariel Hernandez (Cuba) points
1996 3rd place in European Championships at Middleweight, held in Vejle, Denmark. Results were:
Defeated Vitaly Kopitko (Ukraine) points
Defeated Raffaele Bergamasco (Italy) points
Defeated Akaki Kakauridze (Georgia) points
Lost to Zsolt Erdei (Hungary) points
1996 Represented Russia at 1996 Olympic Games in Atlanta, as a Middleweight. Results were:
Defeated Rowan Donaldson (Jamaica) 20-4
Defeated Justann Crawford (Australia) RSC 3 (0:34)
Lost to Ariel Hernandez (Cuba) 8-15
1997 World Champion at Light Heavyweight in competition held in Budapest, Hungary. Results were:
Defeated Igor Dzagouev (Georgia) forfeit
Defeated Tomasz Borowski (Poland) points
Defeated Stephen Kirk (Ireland) KO 2
Defeated Frederic Serrat (France) points
1998 European Champion at Light Heavyweight in competition held in Minsk, Belarus. Results were:
Defeated Gyorgy Hidvegi (Hungary) TKO 3
Defeated Thorsten Bengtson (Germany) points
Defeated Tomasz Adamek (Poland) points
Defeated Courtney Fry (England) TKO 1
2000 European Champion at Light Heavyweight in competition held in Tampere, Finland. Results were:
Defeated Yildirim Tarhan (Turkey) points
Defeated Milorad Gajovic (Yugoslavia) points
Defeated Claudio Rasco (Romania) points
2000 Olympic Gold Medalist at Light Heavyweight in competition held in Sydney, Australia. Results were:
Defeated El Hadji Djibril (Senegal) RSC 3
Defeated Danny Green (Australia) RSC 4
Defeated John Dovi (France) 13-11
Defeated Sergey Mihaylov (Uzbekistan) RSC 1
Defeated Rudolf Kraj (Czech Republic) 20-6

Pro career
Lebziak turned pro in 2001, fighting only one fight and retiring with a record of 1-0-0.

External links
 
 

1969 births
Living people
Boxers at the 1992 Summer Olympics
Boxers at the 1996 Summer Olympics
Boxers at the 2000 Summer Olympics
Olympic boxers of the Unified Team
Olympic boxers of Russia
Olympic gold medalists for Russia
Sportspeople from Donetsk
Olympic medalists in boxing
Russian male boxers
AIBA World Boxing Championships medalists
Medalists at the 2000 Summer Olympics
Light-heavyweight boxers
Competitors at the 1990 Goodwill Games
Competitors at the 1994 Goodwill Games